Lauriea siagiani, is a species of squat lobster in the family Galatheidae, genus Lauriea.

Description
It differs from the only other species in the genus, Lauriea gardineri by a number of features, but most obviously by the coloration: L. gardineri is pale brown with darker bands, while L. siagiani is orange or pink with red or purplish markings.

Distribution and ecology
Lauriea siagiani is found around the giant sponge Xestospongia testudinaria, and has been recorded from Indonesia, the Philippines and Japan.

Taxonomy
Lauriea siagiani was described in 1994 by Keiji Baba; the specific epithet commemorates Wilhelm Siagian, who collected the type material. The species had been previously illustrated by the photographer Roger Steene (as "Galathea sp."), from which Baba recognised that it must represent a new species.

References

External links

 ZooBank
 Explorer's Log - Image and occurrence point data, link to video
 

Squat lobsters
Crustaceans described in 1994